Horst Wende (5 November 1919 – 23 January 1996) was a German bandleader, arranger and composer. He made easy-listening records under his own name as well as under the name Roberto Delgado. He was part of the wave of German-based easy-listening artists who were popular in the 1960s and 1970s, along with Bert Kaempfert and James Last.

Biography
Born in Zeitz, Saxony, he showed musical proficiency at an early age. He played in his grandfather’s band in a restaurant when he was six, and by his teens he was accomplished at playing piano, accordion, xylophone and marimba. He studied music at the Leipzig Conservatory.

He served in the German Army during World War II, but was captured by the British. During his captivity in a Danish prisoner-of-war camp, he met a guitarist named Ladi Geisler, with whom he soon formed a small combo. After the war, he led various combos (which usually included Geisler) in the Salambo Night Club from René Durand & The Tarantella Night Club near the famous Reeperbahn. Horst also played with British Service musicians and big bands such as Edmundo Ros. Settling in Hamburg, he became part of the burgeoning music scene in the port city. Signed to the Polydor label in the 1950s, as a composer, producer and musician he made accordion and dance band music under his own name. He also started with Middle & South America music recordings under the alias of Roberto Delgado, and with piano albums as Mister Pepper. The Delgado albums became popular in Europe, and then found an audience in the UK, Japan and North America and Australia as Polydor opened up several international subsidiaries. It is interesting to note that Wende recorded his albums using the same group of studio musicians who recorded for Kaempfert and Last; in fact, guitarist Ladi Geisler also provided the distinct knack-bass guitar to the Kaempfert sound.

The Delgado recordings were initially Latin-oriented, but they eventually covered a number of different musical genres including African, Italian, Jewish, Oriental, Russian, Greek and Jamaican music as well as Broadway musicals and current pop hits. It could be argued that Wende/Delgado helped to pioneer world music. He managed to break into the German singles market with his version of "Mexico" in 1962. He also arranged music for other German artists such as German folk/pop singer Knut Kiesewetter. Horst made several albums with great international singers including Conny Froboess, Wencke Myhre, Katja Ebstein, Daliah Lavi and Freddy Quinn.

Like most of his pop orchestral contemporaries, Wende’s popularity had faded by the 1980s, and he gradually retired from playing music professionally. In recent years, his music has become popular again, and some of his recordings have been reissued on CD. His work is still much loved and remembered by the many who heard his work. His song "Skokiaan", from the 1958 album Africana, is used at the end of Richard Linklater's film Slacker (1990).

Selected discography
HW - released under the name Horst Wende
 
RD - released under the name Roberto Delgado

MP - released under the name Mister Pepper

LG - released under the name Ladi Geisler with the Horst Wende Orchestra

The following complete Horst Wende Orchestra / Mister Pepper / Roberto Delgado Orchestra list is from Marty Goorts.
The released years are always pressed in the original records like the list below.
1955	International Polka Favourites  HW
1957	Romance Em Veneca  RD
1957	Oriëntal Caravan  HW
1958	Africana  HW
1959   Love Letters  RD
1960	Dance To Delgado  RD
1960	Blaue Nacht Am Hafen  HW
1961	In Strikt Danstempo  HW
1962	Bei Pfeiffers Ist Ball  HW
1962	Portrait Of Horst Wende
1962	Portrait Of Roberto Delgado
1962	Along Mexican Highways Vol. 1  RD
1963	Delgado Hits Pan Americana
1963	Latin Americana  RD
1964	Olé Roberto Delgado  RD
1964	Night Club Dancing Vol. 1  RD
1964   This Is Roberto Delgado  RD
1965	Letkiss  RD
1965	Sirtaki Letkiss  RD
1965	Blue Hawaii Vol. 1  RD
1965	Caramba Vol. 1  RD
1965	Along Mexican Highways Vol. 2 RD
1965  Die Original Schwarzwaldfamilie Seitz  HW
1965	South Of The Border  RD
1965	Camino De Mexico  RD
1965	Night Club Dancing Vol. 2  RD
1966	Tanz Durch's Musical Wunderland  RD
1966	Show Dancing  RD
1966	Italian Romance  RD
1966	Delgado Dancing  RD
1966	Accordion A La Carte Vol. 1  HW
1966	Tanz In Der Taverne  RD
1967	Holiday In Israël  RD (This album - Polydor 184 094 - is incorrectly billed as a Roberto Delgado album)  
1967	Drops  MP
1967	Caramba Vol. 2  RD
1967	Happy Harmonica  HW
1968	Holiday In Scandinavia  RD
1968	Acapulco Holiday  RD
1968	Guitar A La Carte Vol. 1  LG
1968	Wenn Das Schifferklavier An Bord Ertönt  HW
1968	Tanz Im Weissen Rössl  RD
1968	Marimba A La Carte  RD
1968	Dancing Rebecca  RD
1968	Latino Dancing  RD
1968	Blue Hawaii Vol. 2  RD
1968	Spanish Eyes  RD
1968	Hifi Stereo  RD
1969	Accordion In Gold  HW
1969	Latin Rendez-Vous With  RD
1969	Guitar A La Carte Vol. 2  LG
1969	Accordion A La Carte Vol. 2  HW
1969	Hits A La Carte  RD
1969	Latin A La Carte  RD
1969	This Is Roberto Delgado
1970	Hawaiian Nights  RD
1970	Calypso A La Carte  RD
1970	This Is Reggae  RD
1970	Caramba Vol. 3  RD
1970	The Very Best Of Roberto Delgado
1970	Vibraphone A La Carte  RD
1970	African Dancing  RD
1970	Samba Caramba South America Olé  RD
1970	Latin Flutes  RD
1970	Accordéon  HW
1971	South America Let's Dance  RD
1972	Happy Accordion  HW
1972	Latin Special  '72  RD
1972	Wir Stehen Auf Akkordeon Vol. 1  HW
1973	Fiësta For Dancing Vol. 1  RD
1973	Happy South America Stargala  RD
1974	Die Bouzouki Klingt Vol. 1  RD
1974	Wir Stehen Auf Akkordeon Vol. 2  HW
1974	Dance Time With Roberto Delgado
1974	Roberto Delgado
1975	Fiësta For Dancing Vol. 2  RD
1975	20 South America Dancing Hits  RD
1975	South America My Love  RD
1976	Akkordeon Schlager-Parade  HW
1976	Akkordeon Schlager-Parade Zug Um Zug  HW
1976	Die Bouzouki Klingt Vol. 2  RD
1976	Latin Rhythms  RD
1977	Die Grossen Orchester Der Welt  RD
1977	Die Grosse Aktuelle Hammond Schlager-Parade  HW
1977	Fiësta For Dancing Vol. 3  RD
1977	Die Grosse Aktuelle Akkordeon Hitparade  HW
1977	Fiësta Caramba 2000  RD
1977	The Best Of The Best Of Roberto Delgado
1977	Fiësta For Dancing Vol. 4  RD
1977	Roberto Delgado In Gold
1977	Buenos Dias Olé  RD
1977	Concerto D' Aranjuez  RD
1978	Die Balalaika klingt  RD
1978	Music Box Dancer  RD
1979	Jamaica Disco  RD
1979	Roberto Delgado Meets Kalinka
1980	Vacation In The Sun  RD
1980	Fiësta Colombiana & Los Paraguayos  RD
1980	Da Capo Roberto
1980	Tropical Sun Dance  RD
1981	Blue Tropical  RD
1996	El Humahuaqueno  RD  CD
1998	Happy South America  RD  2CD
1999	Happy Holiday Collection  RD  2CD
2000	Lounge Legends  RD  CD
2000	20 South America Dancing Hits  RD  CD
2000	Camino De Mexico  RD  CD
2009   Autour Du Monde  RD  CD
2011   Fiesta & Fiesta For Dancing  RD  2CD
2013   Blue Hawaii  RD  2CD
2014   Bouzouki Magic & Bouzouki King  RD  2CD
2014   Jamaica Disco & Tropical Sun Dance & Dancing Queen  RD  2CD

Bandleaders
Easy listening musicians
1996 deaths
1919 births
20th-century German musicians
20th-century German male musicians
German Army personnel of World War II
German prisoners of war in World War II held by the United Kingdom

es:Horst Wende#top